Panafacom was a Japanese microprocessor design firm formed on 2 July 1973 by a consortium including Fujitsu, Fuji Electric and Matsushita (Panasonic). The company was formed to design and manufacture the MN1610, a 16-bit microprocessor. It was released in April 1975, beating the Texas Instruments TMS9900 to become the world's first single-chip 16-bit microprocessor.

The design saw relatively little use and remains largely unknown in the computer field. In 1987, Panafacom was merged with USAC Electronic Industrial to form today's PFU Limited.

References

External links
 L-16A CPU: A description (in Japanese) of the MN1610 processor.
 MN1613: A description (in Japanese) of the MN1613 processor.

16-bit microprocessors